Mqabba is a town in the Southern Region of Malta. It has a traditional Maltese village layout, with a population of about 3,300 inhabitants. The focal point is the Parish Church of the Assumption, found at the core of the village. It has two band clubs, a number of gardens and a list of national monuments.

About
With 3,315 residents, Mqabba has the characteristics of a typical Maltese village, with stillness prevailing in the small streets of the village. Mqabba was built around the Parish Church, the landmark of the village. The church is dedicated to the Assumption, with its feast being held every 15 August. The feast of Our Lady of Lilies (Madonna tal-Gilju) is celebrated on the third Sunday of June. There is also the feast of St Mary(Santa Marija)

The two band clubs of the village are situated in the piazza. The village feasts are popular with the residents. Other feasts celebrated are the feast of the Immaculate Conception, Our Lady of Sorrows, Corpus Domini and Our Lady of the Holy Rosary.

Other landmarks in the village include chapels dedicated to the Lady of Sorrows, Saint Basil, Saint Michael and Saint Catherine. Mqabba also has  of catacombs which were discovered in the 1860s.

The motto of the village is 'Non Nisi Per Ardua' which translates into 'Only with Ability'.

The importance of Mqabba is shown by the archaeological remains found in the vicinity. Extinct animals were found in quarries at Ta' Kandja and "Tax-Xantin".

Late pre-historic Neolithic until Tarxien periods burials in a natural cave are found in the peripheries of Mqabba, in a site known as "Bur Meghez", in the whereabouts of Tan-Naxxari Quarry. (See also)

One of the most important discoveries in Mqabba is the Paleo Christian "Mintna Catacombs" found in Diamond Jubilee Square in 1860 by Dr. A. A. Caruana and Capt Strickland. The ritual table known as the "Agape" table dominates the whole structure of tombs. Archaeological details were studied by Mayr. Becker, Zammit and Bellanti.

Important structures include the Vincenti Tower.

The main church is dedicated to Assumption of Our Lady and its feast is celebrated on 15 August. The feast of the Immaculate Conception is celebrated on the nearest Sunday to 8 December.  The feast of Our Lady of the Lilies is celebrated on the third Sunday of June.

The titular statue found in the church, that of the Assumption of the blessed Mother of God, was made by Alessandro Farrugia in 1836 and was made similar to the statue of the Assumption which is found in Ghaxaq, made out of wood.  The photograph shows the statue in its original form, as it was prior to 1928, when a new sarcophagus made of silver replaced the original wooden one seen in the picture.  Apart from the sarcophagus, the statue itself has lost none of its characteristics.

The Assumption of Mary is celebrated on 15 August, and is also celebrated in Qrendi, Gudja, Ghaxaq, Mosta, Attard and Victoria (Gozo). It is all celebrated in the same day, as a tradition.

Fireworks displays

The parish feast which is organised between 8 and 15 August brings to Mqabba fireworks enthusiasts as the St. Mary Fireworks Factory, a world-renowned Fireworks group. The group won the first edition of the Malta International Fireworks Festival in 2006 and brought the most important honour in the village's history  when it won the Caput Lucis Fireworks World Championships in 2007, in Valmontone a province of Rome in Italy after competing with seven of the world's most successful firework companies.

The secondary feast fireworks displays take place on the 3rd week of June of each year, the Feast in Honour of Our Lady of Lilies. Ground and Aerial Fireworks display are held on each day of the Feast. The main fireworks event is held on Saturday, eve of the Feast.

A self-propelled vertical firework wheel (a Catherine wheel) with a  diameter was fired on 18 June 2011. It was designed by The Lily Fireworks Factory for the eve of the village's feast of Our Lady of Lilies.

International awards
 Les Etoile d'Or du Jumelage in 1998 (European Union award for twinning) - achieved by the King George V Band within the Society of St. Mary and King George V Band Club Mqabba for a twinning with the Corpo Bandistico Santa Vittoria in Matenano a province of Ascoli-Piceni in Italy.
 The Malta International Fireworks Festival in 2006 won by the St. Mary Fireworks Factory Mqabba
 Caput Lucis - 'Campionato Mondiale di Fuochi d'Artificio d'Autore' in 2007 won by the St. Mary Fireworks Factory Mqabba
 Guinness World Records for the largest Catherine Wheel measured 32.044 m in diameter build by the Lily Fireworks Factory Mqabba on 18 June 2011.

National awards
Won the National Competition for the decoration of the Band Clubs facade during Christmas
Won National Live Crib Competition in 2007 by the Youth Section within the Society of St. Mary and King George V Band Club Mqabba
Won II National Mechanised Ground Fireworks Festival in 2008, by the Lily Fireworks Factory Mqabba
Won IV National Mechanised Ground Fireworks Festival in 2010, by the St. Mary Fireworks Factory Mqabba
Won Premju Ġieħ l-Artiġjanat Malti 2015 for a Three Dimensional Ground fireworks piece by the St. Mary Fireworks Factory Mqabba

Zones in Mqabba
Ħajt tal-Matla
Ħal Millieri
Mintna
Ta' Kandja
Tal-Ħaġra
Tal-Landier
Tal-Wilġa
Tas-Sejba
Tax-Xantin
Tax-Xatba l-Ħamra

See also
Mqabba F.C.
Mqabba Albions A.F.C.

References

External links

Mqabba Local Council
Socjeta Santa Marija Banda Re Gorg V
Socjeta Muzikali Madonna tal-Gilju

 
Towns in Malta
Local councils of Malta